"O' Sailor" is a song written by American singer Fiona Apple and recorded for her third album Extraordinary Machine (2005). On August 15, 2005 (see 2005 in music), ahead of the album's release in early October, Epic Records made available for streaming both "Parting Gift" and "O' Sailor" on Apple's official website. The following day, the songs were released for digital download at the online iTunes Music Store.

It was nominated for eight Music Video Production Company Awards — in the categories of "Direction of a Female Artist", "Director of the Year", "Art Direction", "Cinematography", "Choreography", "Styling", "Hair" and "Make-Up" — and won two: "Direction of a Female Artist" and "Hair".

Formats and track listing

Acetate promo CD single:
1. O' Sailor (Radio Edit) (4:39)
2. O' Sailor (Album Version) (5:36)

Personnel
Piano by Fiona Apple
Drums by Abe Laboriel Jr.
Bass by Mike Elizondo
Tack piano, pump organ, vibes, clavinet, Chamberlin, Farfisa and arp string ensemble by Zac Rae
Yamaha Portasound and 360 Systems by Jebin Bruni
Flute by Glenn Berger

Notes

References
 Perez, Rodrigo. "Fiona Apple's Long-Delayed LP Slotted For October 4 Release". MTV News. August 15, 2005. Retrieved August 31, 2005.
 Cohen, Jonathan. "Fiona Apple fashions a different 'Machine'". Billboard. August 15, 2005. Retrieved August 28, 2005.
 Add on Triple A Chart . Triple A September 15, 2005.

External links
 Extraordinary Machine press release from Epic Records — August 15, 2005
 Lyrics

Fiona Apple songs
2005 singles
Music videos directed by Floria Sigismondi
Songs written by Fiona Apple
Song recordings produced by Mike Elizondo
2005 songs